Sulisław  is a village in the administrative district of Gmina Dębno, within Myślibórz County, West Pomeranian Voivodeship, in north-western Poland.

The village has a population of 29.

References

Villages in Myślibórz County